Kjell Erik Killi Olsen (born 23 July 1952 in Trondheim)  is a Norwegian painter and sculptor. He is primarily known for characteristic artwork, frequently depicting humanoid, grotesque, sexual and humorous figures of fantasy.

Biography
Kjell Erik Killi Olsen was educated at Kunstskolen i Trondheim, Akademia Sztuk Pięknych at Kraków, Poland and at the Norwegian National Academy of Fine Arts in Oslo during the period 1972–1981.

In addition to shows and retrospectives in Norway, Killi Olsen has held exhibitions in other parts of the world, most frequently New York City and São Paulo. He is considered one of Norway's most wealthy artists.
Erik Killi Olsen lives in Oslo, Norway and Château de Fontarèches, Fontarèches,  France.

Selected solo exhibition
2018 The Queen Sonja Art Stable, Oslo, Norway
2015 Galerie Pascal Lainé, Ménerbes, France
2014 Smart Clothes, New York City, United States
2013 Loock Galerie, Berlin, Germany
2011 The Second Book, Galleri Erik Steen, Oslo, Norway
2010 Formuesforvaltning, Oslo, Norway
2009 Aalesunds Kunstforening, Ålesun, Norway
2008 Arkivhusstiftelsen, Smedjebacken, Sverig, Sweden
2007 The Beginning, Trondheim Kunstmuseum, Norway
2007 The Beginning, Nordnorsk Kunstmuseum, Norway
2005 The Beginning, Henie Onstad Art Centre, Høvikodden, Norway
2005 Heiberg Cummings Design, New York, USA
2004 Galleri Wang, Oslo, Norway
2004 Rogaland Kunstmuseum with Michael Kvium, Stavanger, Norway
2003 Pincoteca do Estado, São Paulo, Brazil
2003 Esbjerg Kunstmuseum with Michael Kvium, Esbjer, Denmark
2001 Lillehammer Art Museum, Lillehammer, Norway
2001 Galleri Wang, Oslo, Norway
1998 Christianssand Art Society, Kristiansa, Norway
1998 Bridgewater/Lustberg Gallery, New York, USA
1998 Galleri Christian Dam, Copenhagen
1997 Galleri Bouhlou, Bergen, Norway
1997 Trondheim Art Museum, Trondheim, Norway
1996 Rogaland Art Center, Stavanger, Norway
1996 Henie Onstad Art Center, Høvikodde, Norway
1996 Galleri Bodøgaard, Bodø, Norway
1996 Bridgewater/Lustberg Gallery, New York, USA
1996 Galleri Brandstrup, Stavanger, Norway
1995 Galleri Wang, Oslo, Norway
1995 Bergen International Festival, Bergen Art Society; Stavanger Art Society, Stenersenmuseet, Oslo, Norway
1993 Bergen Art Society, Bergen, Norway
1993 Galleri Sølvberget, Stavanger, Norway
1993 Galleri Ismene, Trondhei, Norway
1992 Galleri Wang, Oslo, Norway
1992 Nordnorsk Kunstmuseum, Tromsø, Norway
1990 Wang Kunsthandel, Stavanger, Norway
1990 Festivalexhibitor, Molde, Norway
1989 Bergen Art Society, Bergen, Norway
1989 Galleri Sølvberget, Stavanger, Norway
1989 Sala Uno, Roma, Italy
1989 Norway’s representative at The Biennale in São Paulo, Brazil
1988 Galleri Wang, Oslo, Norway
1987 Salvatore Ala Gallery, New York, USA
1986 Galleria Salvatore Ala, Milan, Italy
1985 New Math Gallery, New York, USA
1985 Galleri Ingeleiv, Bergen, Norway
1985 Bridgewater Gallery, New York, USA
1984 Henie-Onstad Artcenter, Høvikodde, Norway
1984 New Math Gallery, New York, USA
1983 ABC No Rio, New York, USA
1983 New Math Gallery, New York, USA

Public collections
 The National Gallery, Oslo, Norway
 Riksgalleriet, Oslo, Norway
 Norwegian Art Council, Oslo, Norway
 NorwayTröndelag Artmuseum, Trondheim, Norway
 Bergen Billedgalleri, Bergen, Norway
 Tromsø Museum, Tromsø, Norway
 The town of Lillehammer Art-collection, Lillehammer, Norway
 The National Museum of Contemporary Art, Oslo, Norway
 NorwayRogaland Kunstmuseum, Stavanger, Norway
 Göteborg Konstmuseum, Gothenburg, Sweden
 Museum of Modern Art, Campinas, Brazil
 Norsk Hydro ASA, Oslo, Norway

Selected public commissions
1996 Libris Karl Johan, Oslo, Norway
1996 Aschehoug Publishing Company, Oslo, Norway
1994 Statoil, Trondheim, Norway
1994 Artscape Nordland, Bø; i Vesterålen, Norway
1994 Bergesen d.y. A/S, Oslo, Norway
1991 Olavshallen, Trondheim, Norway
1990 Namsos Cultural Center, Namsos, Norway
1988 Sola Airport, Sola, Norway

External links
Kjell Erik Killi Olsen at Galerie Pascal Lainé
Kjell Erik Killi Olsen at Galleri Erik Steen
Kjell Erik Killi Olsen biography and interview FineArt.no 
Kjell Erik Killi Olsen works Galleri Elsa 

1952 births
Living people
20th-century Norwegian painters
21st-century Norwegian painters
Norwegian male painters
Norwegian sculptors
20th-century sculptors
20th-century Norwegian male artists
21st-century Norwegian male artists